The United States officially recognised Albania as an Independent state on August 28, 1922. Shortly thereafter, a consulate office was opened in New York and the two countries had finally established diplomatic ties. During the onset of World War II, on September 16, 1939, the US Legation closed its mission in Albania. As a result, bilateral relations were suspended and remained so for a period of 52 years. Relations were finally restored on March 15, 1991, when William Ryerson became the first US ambassador since the war to serve in the country.

List of diplomatic representatives of Albania to the United States (1920–present)

References 

 
United States
Albania